Protandrenini is a tribe of mining bees in the family Andrenidae. There are at least 12 genera and at least 380 described species in Protandrenini.

Genera
These 12 genera belong to the tribe Protandrenini (some authors treat subgenera within this classification as genera):

 Anthemurgus Robertson, 1902
 Anthrenoides Ducke, 1907
 Chaeturginus Lucas de Oliveira & Moure, 1963
 Liphanthus Reed, 1894
 Neffapis Ruz, 1995
 Parapsaenythia Friese, 1908
 Protandrena Cockerell, 1896
 Psaenythia Gerstäcker, 1868
 Psaenythisca Ramos, 2014
 Pseudopanurgus Cockerell, 1897
 Rhophitulus Ducke, 1907
 Stenocolletes Schrottky, 1909 (incertae sedis)

References

Further reading

External links

 

Andrenidae
Articles created by Qbugbot